Madison Township is one of thirteen townships in Fremont County, Iowa, United States.  As of the 2010 census, its population was 141 and it contained 68 housing units.

Geography

Cemeteries
The township contains Beehive Cemetery, Columbia and French Cemetery, Mount Olive Cemetery, Stauch Cemetery, Utterback Cemetery and Wesleyan Cemetery.

Transportation
 Iowa Highway 333
 U.S. Route 275

School districts
 Farragut Community School District
 Hamburg Community School District

Political districts
 Iowa's 3rd congressional district
 State House District 23
 State Senate District 12

References

External links
 City-Data.com

Townships in Iowa
Townships in Fremont County, Iowa